The 2022 Atlantic 10 women's basketball tournament (A-10) is the postseason women's basketball tournament for the Atlantic 10 Conference's 2021–22 season. It is being held from March 2 through March 6, 2022, at the Chase Fieldhouse in Wilmington, Delaware.

Seeds 
All 14 A-10 schools are participating in the tournament. Teams are seeded by winning percentage within the conference, with a tiebreaker system to seed teams with identical percentages. The top 10 teams receive a first-round bye and the top four teams receive a double-bye, automatically advancing them to the quarterfinals.

Schedule 

*Game times in Eastern Time.

Bracket

References 

2021–22 Atlantic 10 Conference women's basketball season
Atlantic 10 women's basketball tournament
College basketball tournaments in Delaware
Atlantic 10 women's basketball tournament
Atlantic 10 women's basketball tournament
Sports competitions in Wilmington, Delaware
Women's sports in Delaware